A carriage is a private four-wheeled vehicle for people and is most commonly horse-drawn. Second-hand private carriages were common public transport, the equivalent of modern cars used as taxis. Carriage suspensions are by leather strapping and, on those made in recent centuries, steel springs.  Two-wheeled carriages are informal and usually owner-driven.

Coaches are a special category within carriages. They are carriages with four corner posts and a fixed roof.

Two-wheeled war chariots and transport vehicles such as four-wheeled wagons and two-wheeled carts were forerunners of carriages.

In the twenty-first century, horse-drawn carriages are occasionally used for public parades by royalty and for traditional formal ceremonies. Simplified modern versions are made for tourist transport in warm countries and for those cities where tourists expect open horse-drawn carriages to be provided. Simple metal sporting versions are still made for the sport known as competitive driving.

Overview

The word carriage (abbreviated carr or cge) is from Old Northern French , to carry in a vehicle. The word car, then meaning a kind of two-wheeled cart for goods, also came from Old Northern French about the beginning of the 14th century (probably derived from the Late Latin , a car); it is also used for railway carriages and in the US around the end of the 19th century, early cars (automobiles) were briefly called horseless carriages.

History

Prehistory
Some horsecarts found in Celtic graves show hints that their platforms were suspended elastically. Four-wheeled wagons were used in Bronze Age Europe, and their form known from excavations suggests that the basic construction techniques of wheel and undercarriage (that survived until the age of the motor car) were established then.

Bullock carriage 
A bullock carriage, also known as a bullock cart, is a large, four wheeled carriage typically pulled by oxen. It conventionally includes a sturdy wooden tongue between the wheels, a yoke connecting the pair of oxen, a wooden platform for passengers or cargo, and large steel rimmed wooden wheels. These carriages were first protyped in the 3rd millennium BC and predated chariots. Evidence of both light and heavy wheeled bullock carriages have been found in sites like Mohenjo—Daro, Harappa and Chanhu-daro.

Chariot

Two-wheeled carriage models have been discovered from the Indus valley civilization including twin horse drawn covered carriages resembling ekka from various sites such as Harappa, Mohenjo Daro and Chanhu Daro. The earliest recorded sort of carriage was the chariot, reaching Mesopotamia as early as 1900 BC. Used typically for warfare by Egyptians, the Near Easterners and Europeans, it was essentially a two-wheeled light basin carrying one or two passengers, drawn by one to two horses.  The chariot was revolutionary and effective because it delivered fresh warriors to crucial areas of battle with swiftness.

Roman carriage

First century BC Romans used sprung wagons for overland journeys. It is likely that Roman carriages employed some form of suspension on chains or leather straps, as indicated by carriage parts found in excavations. In 2021 archaeologists discovered the remains of a ceremonial four wheel carriage, a pilentum, near the ancient Roman city of Pompeii. It is thought the pilentum may have been used in ceremonies such as weddings. The find has been described as being "in an excellent state of preservation".

Ancient Chinese carriage
During the Zhou dynasty of China, the Warring States were also known to have used carriages as transportation. With the decline of these city-states and kingdoms, these techniques almost disappeared.

Medieval carriage

The medieval carriage was typically a four-wheeled wagon type, with a rounded top ("tilt") similar in appearance to the Conestoga Wagon familiar from the United States.  Sharing the traditional form of wheels and undercarriage known since the Bronze Age, it very likely also employed the pivoting fore-axle in continuity from the ancient world.  Suspension (on chains) is recorded in visual images and written accounts from the 14th century ("chars branlant" or rocking carriages), and was in widespread use by the 15th century.  Carriages were largely used by royalty, aristocrats (and especially by women), and could be elaborately decorated and gilded.  These carriages were usually on four wheels and were drawn by two to four horses depending on their size and status.  Wood and iron were the primary materials needed to build a carriage and carriages that were used by non-royalty were covered by plain leather.

Another form of carriage was the pageant wagon of the 14th century.  Historians debate the structure and size of pageant wagons; however, they are generally miniature house-like structures that rest on four to six wheels depending on the size of the wagon.  The pageant wagon is significant because up until the 14th century most carriages were on two or three wheels; the chariot, rocking carriage, and baby carriage are two examples of carriages which pre-date the pageant wagon.  Historians also debate whether or not pageant wagons were built with pivotal axle systems, which allowed the wheels to turn.  Whether it was a four- or six-wheel pageant wagon, most historians maintain that pivotal axle systems were implemented on pageant wagons because many roads were often winding with some sharp turns.  Six wheel pageant wagons also represent another innovation in carriages; they were one of the first carriages to use multiple pivotal axles.  Pivotal axles were used on the front set of wheels and the middle set of wheels.  This allowed the horse to move freely and steer the carriage in accordance with the road or path.

Coach

One of the great innovations in carriage history was the invention of the suspended carriage or the chariot branlant (though whether this was a Roman or medieval innovation remains uncertain).  The "chariot branlant" of medieval illustrations was suspended by chains rather than leather straps as had been believed. Suspension, whether on chains or leather, might provide a smoother ride since the carriage body no longer rested on the axles, but could not prevent swinging (branlant) in all directions. It is clear from illustrations (and surviving examples) that the medieval suspended carriage with a round tilt was a widespread European type, referred to by any number of names (car, currus, char, chariot).

In 14th century England carriages, like the one illustrated in the Luttrell Psalter, would still have been a quite rare means of aristocratic transport, and they would have been very costly until the end of the century. They would have had four six-spoke six-foot high wheels that were linked by greased axles under the body of the coach, and did not necessarily have any suspension. The chassis was made from oak beam and the barrel shaped roof was covered in brightly painted leather or cloth. The interior would include seats, beds, cushions, tapestries and even rugs. They would be pulled by four to five horses.

Under King Mathias Corvinus (1458–90), who enjoyed fast travel, the Hungarians developed fast road transport, and the town of Kocs between Budapest and Vienna became an important post-town, and gave its name to the new vehicle type. The earliest illustrations of the Hungarian "Kochi-wagon" do not indicate any suspension, a body with high sides of lightweight wickerwork, and typically drawn by three horses in harness. Later models were considerably lighter and famous for a single horse being able to draw many passengers.

The Hungarian coach spread across Europe, initially rather slowly, in part due to Ippolito d'Este of Ferrara (1479–1529), nephew of Mathias' queen Beatrix of Aragon, who as a very junior Archbishopric of Esztergom developed a taste for Hungarian riding and took his carriage and driver back to Italy. Then rather suddenly, in around 1550, the "coach" made its appearance throughout the major cities of Europe, and the new word entered the vocabulary of all their languages. However, the new "coach" seems to have been a fashionable concept (fast road travel for men) as much as any particular type of vehicle, and there is no obvious technological change that accompanied the innovation, either in the use of suspension (which came earlier), or the adoption of springs (which came later).  As its use spread throughout Europe in the late 16th century, the coach's body structure was ultimately changed, from a round-topped tilt to the "four-poster" carriages that became standard everywhere by c.1600.

Later development of the coach

The coach had doors in the side, with an iron step protected by leather that became the "boot" in which servants might ride.  The driver sat on a seat at the front, and the most important occupant sat in the back facing forwards.  The earliest coaches can be seen at Veste Coburg, Lisbon, and the Moscow Kremlin, and they become a commonplace in European art.  It was not until the 17th century that further innovations with steel springs and glazing took place, and only in the 18th century, with better road surfaces, was there a major innovation with the introduction of the steel C-spring.

Many innovations were proposed, and some patented, for new types of suspension or other features. It was only from the 18th century that changes to steering systems were suggested, including the use of the 'fifth wheel' substituted for the pivoting fore-axle, and on which the carriage turned. Another proposal came from Erasmus Darwin, a young English doctor who was driving a carriage about 10,000 miles a year to visit patients all over England.  Darwin found two essential problems or shortcomings of the commonly used light carriage or Hungarian carriage.  First, the front wheels were turned by a pivoting front axle, which had been used for years, but these wheels were often quite small and hence the rider, carriage and horse felt the brunt of every bump on the road.  Secondly, he recognized the danger of overturning.

A pivoting front axle changes a carriage's base from a rectangle to a triangle because the wheel on the inside of the turn is able to turn more sharply than the outside front wheel. Darwin suggested a fix for these insufficiencies by proposing a principle in which the two front wheels turn (independently of the front axle) about a centre that lies on the extended line of the back axle. This idea was later patented in 1818 as Ackermann steering.  Darwin argued that carriages would then be easier to pull and less likely to overturn.

Carriage use in North America came with the establishment of European settlers.  Early colonial horse tracks quickly grew into roads especially as the colonists extended their territories southwest.  Colonists began using carts as these roads and trading increased between the north and south.  Eventually, carriages or coaches were sought to transport goods as well as people.  As in Europe, chariots, coaches and/or carriages were a mark of status.  The tobacco planters of the South were some of the first Americans to use the carriage as a form of human transportation.  As the tobacco farming industry grew in the southern colonies so did the frequency of carriages, coaches and wagons.  Upon the turn of the 18th century, wheeled vehicle use in the colonies was at an all-time high.  Carriages, coaches and wagons were being taxed based on the number of wheels they had.  These taxes were implemented in the South primarily as the South had superior numbers of horses and wheeled vehicles when compared to the North.  Europe, however, still used carriage transportation far more often and on a much larger scale than anywhere else in the world.

Demise
Carriages and coaches began to disappear as use of steam propulsion began to generate more and more interest and research.  Steam power quickly won the battle against animal power as is evident by a newspaper article written in England in 1895 entitled "Horseflesh vs. Steam". The article highlights the death of the carriage as the main means of transportation.

Today
Nowadays, carriages are still used for day-to-day transport in the United States by some minority groups such as the Amish. They are also still used in tourism as vehicles for sightseeing in cities such as Bruges, Vienna, New Orleans, and Little Rock, Arkansas.

The most complete working collection of carriages can be seen at the Royal Mews in London where a large selection of vehicles is in regular use.  These are supported by a staff of liveried coachmen, footmen and postillions.  The horses earn their keep by supporting the work of the Royal Household, particularly during ceremonial events.  Horses pulling a large carriage known as a "covered brake" collect the Yeoman of the Guard in their distinctive red uniforms from St James's Palace for Investitures at Buckingham Palace; High Commissioners or Ambassadors are driven to their audiences with the Queen in landaus; visiting heads of state are transported to and from official arrival ceremonies and members of the Royal Family are driven in Royal Mews coaches during Trooping the Colour, the Order of the Garter service at Windsor Castle and carriage processions at the beginning of each day of Royal Ascot.

Construction

Body

Carriages may be enclosed or open, depending on the type. The top cover for the body of a carriage, called the head or hood, is often flexible and designed to be folded back when desired. Such a folding top is called a bellows top or calash. A hoopstick forms a light framing member for this kind of hood. The top, roof or second-story compartment of a closed carriage, especially a diligence, was called an imperial. A closed carriage may have side windows called quarter lights (British) as well as windows in the doors, hence a "glass coach". On the forepart of an open carriage, a screen of wood or leather called a dashboard intercepts water, mud or snow thrown up by the heels of the horses. The dashboard or carriage top sometimes has a projecting sidepiece called a wing (British). A foot iron or footplate may serve as a carriage step.

A carriage driver sits on a box or perch, usually elevated and small. When at the front, it is known as a dickey box, a term also used for a seat at the back for servants. A footman might use a small platform at the rear called a footboard or a seat called a rumble behind the body. Some carriages have a moveable seat called a jump seat. Some seats had an attached backrest called a lazyback.

The shafts of a carriage were called limbers in English dialect. Lancewood, a tough elastic wood of various trees, was often used especially for carriage shafts. A holdback, consisting of an iron catch on the shaft with a looped strap, enables a horse to back or hold back the vehicle. The end of the tongue of a carriage is suspended from the collars of the harness by a bar called the yoke. At the end of a trace, a loop called a cockeye attaches to the carriage.

In some carriage types, the body is suspended from several leather straps called braces or thoroughbraces, attached to or serving as springs.

Undercarriage

Beneath the carriage body is the undergear or undercarriage (or simply carriage), consisting of the running gear and chassis. The wheels and axles, in distinction from the body, are the running gear. The wheels revolve upon bearings or a spindle at the ends of a bar or beam called an axle or axletree. Most carriages have either one or two axles. On a four-wheeled vehicle, the forward part of the running gear, or forecarriage, is arranged to permit the front axle to turn independently of the fixed rear axle. In some carriages a dropped axle, bent twice at a right angle near the ends, allows for a low body with large wheels. A guard called a dirtboard keeps dirt from the axle arm.

Several structural members form parts of the chassis supporting the carriage body. The fore axletree and the splinter bar above it (supporting the springs) are united by a piece of wood or metal called a futchel, which forms a socket for the pole that extends from the front axle. For strength and support, a rod called the backstay may extend from either end of the rear axle to the reach, the pole or rod joining the hind axle to the forward bolster above the front axle.

A skid called a drag, dragshoe, shoe or skidpan retards the motion of the wheels. A London patent of 1841 describes one such apparatus: "An iron-shod beam, slightly longer than the radius of the wheel, is hinged under the axle so that when it is released to strike the ground the forward momentum of the vehicle wedges it against the axle". The original feature of this modification was that instead of the usual practice of having to stop the carriage to retract the beam and so lose useful momentum the chain holding it in place is released (from the driver's position) so that it is allowed to rotate further in its backwards direction, releasing the axle. A system of "pendant-levers" and straps then allows the beam to return to its first position and be ready for further use.

A catch or block called a trigger may be used to hold a wheel on an incline.

A horizontal wheel or segment of a wheel called a fifth wheel sometimes forms an extended support to prevent the carriage from tipping; it consists of two parts rotating on each other about the kingbolt or perchbolt above the fore axle and beneath the body. A block of wood called a headblock might be placed between the fifth wheel and the forward spring.

Fittings 
Many of these fittings were carried over to horseless carriages and evolved into the modern elements of automobiles. During the Brass Era they were often the same parts on either type of carriage (i.e., horse-drawn or horseless). 
 Upholstery (trimming): traditionally similar to the upholstery of furniture; evolved into car interior upholstery such as car seats and door trim panels
 Carriage lamps: typically oil lamps for centuries, although carbide lamps and battery-powered electric lamps were also used in the late 19th and early 20th centuries; evolved into car headlamps
 Trunk: a luggage trunk serving the same purpose as, and which gave its name to, later car trunks
 Toolbox: a small box with enough hand tools to make simple repairs on the roadside
 Blankets: in winter, blankets for the driver and passengers and often horse blankets as well
 Running board: a step to assist in climbing onto the carriage and also sometimes a place for standing passengers
 Shovel: useful for mud and snow in the roadway, to free the carriage from being stuck; was especially important in the era when most roads were dirt roads, often with deep ruts
 Buggy whip or coachwhip: whips for the horses. For obvious reasons, this is one of the components of carriage equipment that did not carry over from horse-drawn carriages to horseless carriages, and that fact has made such whips one of the prototypical or stereotypical examples of products whose manufacture is subject to disruptive innovation

Carriage terminology

A person whose business was to drive a carriage was a coachman. A servant in livery called a footman or piquer formerly served in attendance upon a rider or was required to run before his master's carriage to clear the way. An attendant on horseback called an outrider often rode ahead of or next to a carriage. A carriage starter directed the flow of vehicles taking on passengers at the curbside. A hackneyman hired out horses and carriages. When hawking wares, a hawker was often assisted by a carriage.

Upper-class people of wealth and social position, those wealthy enough to keep carriages, were referred to as carriage folk or carriage trade.

Carriage passengers often used a lap robe as a blanket or similar covering for their legs, lap and feet. A buffalo robe, made from the hide of an American bison dressed with the hair on, was sometimes used as a carriage robe; it was commonly trimmed to rectangular shape and lined on the skin side with fabric. A carriage boot, fur-trimmed for winter wear, was made usually of fabric with a fur or felt lining. A knee boot protected the knees from rain or splatter.

A horse especially bred for carriage use by appearance and stylish action is called a carriage horse; one for use on a road is a road horse. One such breed is the Cleveland Bay, uniformly bay in color, of good conformation and strong constitution. Horses were broken in using a bodiless carriage frame called a break or brake.

A carriage dog or coach dog is bred for running beside a carriage.

A roofed structure that extends from the entrance of a building over an adjacent driveway and that shelters callers as they get in or out of their vehicles is known as a carriage porch or porte cochere. An outbuilding for a carriage is a coach house, which was often combined with accommodation for a groom or other servants.

A livery stable kept horses and usually carriages for hire. A range of stables, usually with carriage houses (remises) and living quarters built around a yard, court or street, is called a mews.

A kind of dynamometer called a peirameter indicates the power necessary to haul a carriage over a road or track.

Competitive driving

In most European and English-speaking countries, driving is a competitive equestrian sport. Many horse shows host driving competitions for a particular style of driving, breed of horse, or type of vehicle. Show vehicles are usually carriages, carts, or buggies and, occasionally, sulkies or wagons. Modern high-technology carriages are made purely for competition by companies such as Bennington Carriages. in England.
Terminology varies: the simple, lightweight two- or four-wheeled show vehicle common in many nations is called a "cart" in the USA, but a "carriage" in Australia.

Internationally, there is intense competition in the all-round test of driving: combined driving, also known as horse-driving trials, an equestrian discipline regulated by the Fédération Équestre Internationale (International Equestrian Federation) with national organizations representing each member country. World championships are conducted in alternate years, including single-horse, horse pairs and four-in-hand championships. The World Equestrian Games, held at four-year intervals, also includes a four-in-hand competition.

For pony drivers, the World Combined Pony Championships are held every two years and include singles, pairs and four-in-hand events.

Carriage collections 

Argentina
Muhfit (Museo Histórico Fuerte Independencia Tandil), Tandil.
Australia
Cobb + Co Museum – National Carriage Collection, Queensland Museum, Toowoomba, Queensland.
The National Trust of Australia (Victoria) Carriage Collection
Austria
Museum of Carriages and Department of Court Uniforms, Kunsthistorisches Museum, Vienna.
Belgium
 VZW Rijtuigmuseum Bree, Bree, Limburg
 De Groom Carriage Center Bruges, Bruges, West Flanders
 Koetsenmuseum Verdonckt
 Royal Museum for Art and History Brussels (KMKG/MRAH)
Brazil
 National Historical Museum in Rio de Janeiro, Brazil
 Imperial Museum in Petrópolis, Brazil
Canada
 The Remington Carriage Museum in Cardston, Alberta, Canada
 The Campbell Carriage Factory Museum in Sackville, New Brunswick, Canada
 The Kings Landing Historical Settlement in Prince William, New Brunswick, Canada, has a large collection of horse and oxen drawn vehicles.
Denmark
 Royal Carriage Museum, Christiansborg Palace, Copenhagen
 Slesvigske Vognsamling, Haderslev
Egypt
Carriage Museum
France
Apremont-sur-Allier, Musée des calèches (Berry)
Bourg, Musée Au temps des calèches (Guyenne)
Cazes-Mondenard, Musée de l'Attelage et du corbillard Yvan Quercy (Quercy)
château de Chambord. Salle des carrosses du comte de Chambord (Sologne, Orléanais)
château de Compiègne. Musée National de la voiture et du tourisme de Compiègne (Picardie)
Cussac-Fort-Médoc, Musée du cheval du château Lanessan (Guyenne)
Le Fleix, Musée de l’hippomobile André Clament (Périgord)
Les Épesses, Musée de la voiture à cheval (Vendée, Bas-Poitou)
Marcigny, Musée de la voiture à cheval (Bourgogne)
Plouay. Musée du conservatoire breton de la voiture hippomobile (Brittany)
Sacy-le-grand, Musée du cheval de trait (Picardie)
Saint-Auvent, musée Au temps jadis (Limousin)
Sérignan, Musée de l’attelage et du cheval (Languedoc)
château de Vaux-le-Vicomte, Musée des Equipages (Île-de-France)
Palace of Versailles, Galerie des carrosses, The Versailles Stables (Île-de-France)
Germany
Romano-Germanic Museum
Marstallmuseum of Carriages and Sleighs in the former Royal Stables, Nymphenburg Palace, Munich
 Hesse Museum of Carriages and Sleighs in Lohfelden near Kassel
Italy
 Museo "Le Carrozze d'Epoca", Rome.
 Museo Civico delle Carrozze d'Epoca di Codroipo.
 Museo Civico delle Carrozze d'Epoca, San Martino, Udine.
 Museo della Carrozza di Macerata.
 Museo delle Carrozze del Quirinale, Rome.
 Museo delle Carrozze di Palazzo Farnese, Piacenza.
 Museo delle Carrozze, Catanzaro.
 Museo delle Carrozze, Naples.
Japan
 Japanese Imperial Household Agency, Tokyo
Netherlands
Nationaal Rijtuigmuseum, Leek in Groningen.
Poland
 Łańcut Castle
 Rogalin Palace
Portugal
 National Coach Museum (Museu dos Coches), Lisbon
 Geraz do Lima Carriage museum
Spain
 Carriage Museum, Seville
United Kingdom
 Mossman Collection, Luton, Bedfordshire
 Royal Mews at Buckingham Palace, London.
 Swingletree Carriage Collection. John Parker Swingletree Carriage Driving, Swingletree, Wingfield, Nr. Diss, Norfolk
 National Trust Carriage Museum, Arlington Court, near Barnstaple, Devon
 The Tyrwhitt-Drake Museum of Carriages, Maidstone, Kent
United States
 Florida Carriage Museum, Weirsdale, Florida. Formerly Austin Carriage Museum.
 Skyline Farm Carriage Museum, North Yarmouth, Maine
 The Carriage Collection of the Owls Head Transportation Museum, Owls Head, Maine.
 The Carriage Museum, Washington, Kentucky
 Carriage Museum of America, Lexington, Kentucky
 Henry Ford Museum, Dearborn, Michigan
 The Long Island Museum of American Art, History & Carriages, Stony Brook, New York
 Pioneer Village, Farmington, Utah.
 Thrasher Carriage Museum, Frostburg, Maryland
 The Wesley W. Jung Carriage Museum, Greenbush, Wisconsin
 Shelburne Museum, Shelburne, Vermont
 Forney Museum of Transportation, Denver, Colorado
 Mifflinburg Buggy Museum, Mifflinburg, PA.  Only museum in US that preserves an original intact 19th century carriage factory.
 Frick Art & Historical Center Car & Carriage Museum, Pittsburgh, Pennsylvania, preserving carriages owned by Henry Clay Frick and his family.
 The Northwest Carriage Museum, Raymond, Washington.

Types of horse-drawn carriages

Numerous varieties of horse-drawn carriages existed, Arthur Ingram's Horse Drawn Vehicles since 1760 in Colour lists 325 types with a short description of each. By the early 19th century one's choice of carriage was only in part based on practicality and performance; it was also a status statement and subject to changing fashions.

See also

 Bullock carriage, a carriage pulled by oxen
 Coach (carriage)
 Coupé (carriage)
 Driving (horse)
 Horse and buggy
 Horse-drawn vehicle
 Horsecar
 Horse harness
 Horseless carriage (term for early automobiles)
 Howdah (carriage positioned on the back of an elephant or camel)
 Ox-wagon
 Steering undercarriage
 Wagon
 Wagonette
 War wagon

Notes

Further reading
 Bean, Heike, & Sarah Blanchard (authors), Joan Muller (illustrator), Carriage Driving: A Logical Approach Through Dressage Training, Howell Books, 1992. 
 Berkebile, Don H., American Carriages, Sleighs, Sulkies, and Carts: 168 Illustrations from Victorian Sources, Dover Publications, 1977. 
 Boyer, Marjorie Nice. "Mediaeval Suspended Carriages". Speculum, v34 n3 (July 1959): 359–366.
 Boyer, Marjorie Nice. Mediaeval Suspended Carriages. Cambridge, Mass.: The Mediaeval Academy of America, 1959. .
 Bristol Wagon Works Co., Bristol Wagon & Carriage Illustrated Catalog, 1900, Dover Publications, 1994. 
 Elkhart Manufacturing Co., Horse-Drawn Carriage Catalog, 1909 (Dover Pictorial Archives), Dover Publications, 2001. 
 Hutchins, Daniel D., Wheels Across America: Carriage Art & Craftsmanship, Tempo International Publishing Company, 1st edition, 2004. 
 Ingram, Arthur, Horse Drawn Vehicles since 1760 in Colour, Blandford Press, 1977. 
 King-Hele, Desmond. "Erasmus Darwin's Improved Design for Steering Carriages—And Cars". Notes and Records of the Royal Society of London, 56, no. 1 (2002): 41–62.
 Kinney, Thomas A., The Carriage Trade: Making Horse-Drawn Vehicles in America (Studies in Industry and Society), The Johns Hopkins University Press, 2004. 
 Lawrence, Bradley & Pardee, Carriages and Sleighs: 228 Illustrations from the 1862 Lawrence, Bradley & Pardee Catalog, Dover Publications, 1998. 
 Museums at Stony Brook, The Carriage Collection, Museums, 2000. 
 Nelson Alan H. "Six-Wheeled Carts: An Underview". Technology and Culture, v13 n3 (July 1972): 391–416.
 Richardson, M. T., Practical Carriage Building, Astragal Press, 1994. 
 Ryder, Thomas (author), Rodger Morrow (editor), The Coson Carriage Collection at Beechdale, The Carriage Association of America, 1989. .
 Wackernagel, Rudolf H., Wittelsbach State and Ceremonial Carriages: Coaches, Sledges and Sedan Chairs in the Marstallmuseum Schloss Nymphenburg, Arnoldsche Verlagsanstalt GmbH, 2002. 
 Walrond, Sallie, Looking at Carriages, J. A. Allen & Co., 1999. 
 Ware, I. D., Coach-Makers' Illustrated Hand-Book, 1875: Containing Complete Instructions in All the Different Branches of Carriage Building, Astragal Press, 2nd edition, 1995. 
 Westermann, William Linn. "On Inland Transportation and Communication in Antiquity". Political Science Quarterly, v43 n3 (September 1928): 364–387.
 "Colonial Roads and Wheeled Vehicles". The William and Mary Quarterly, v8 n1 (July 1899): 37–42. .

External links

 19th century American carriages: Their manufacture, decoration and use. By Museums at Stony Brook, Stony Brook, NY, 1987. Long Island Digital Books Project, CONTENTdm Collection, Stony Brook University, Southampton, New York.
 19th Century Transportation-Carriages. University of North Carolina at Charlotte.
 All About Romance Novels – Carriages in Regency & Victorian Times.
 Appendix to Cadillac "Styling" section (coaching terminology). The Classic Car-Nection: Yann Saunders, Cadillac Database. Drawings and text
 CAAOnline: Carriage Tour Carriage Association of America. Photos and text.
 Calisphere – A World of Digital Resources. Search carriage. University of California. Hundreds of photos.
 Carriages & Coaches: Their History & Their Evolution by Ralph Straus, 1912, London.
 Carriage House and Carriage parts. ThinkQuest Library. Illustrations and text.
 Colonial Carriage Works – America's Finest Selection of Horse Drawn Vehicles. Columbus, Wisconsin.
 Driving for Pleasure, Or The Harness Stable and its Appointments by Francis Underhill, 1896.  Carnegie Mellon University. A comprehensive overview, with photographs of horse-drawn carriages in use at the turn of the 19th century. Full text free to read, with free full text search.
 An Encyclopædia of Domestic Economy, Comprising Subjects Connected with the Interests of Every Individual..., by Thomas Webster and William Parkes, 1855. Book XXIII, Carriages. Google Book Search.
 English Pleasure Carriages: Their Origin, History, Varieties, Materials, Construction, Defects, Improvements, and Capabilities: With an Analysis of the Construction of Common Roads and Railroads, and the Public Vehicles Used on Them; Together with Descriptions of New Inventions by William Bridges Adams, 1837. Google Book Search.
 Four wheeled vehicles. The Guild of Model Wheelwrights.
 Galaxy of Images | Smithsonian Institution Libraries. Carriages and sleighs.
 Georgian Index – Carriages. Georgian Index. Illustrations and text.
 The History of Coaches, by George Athelstane Thrupp, 1877. Google Book Search.
 Horse-drawn Transportation Clipart etc. Educational Technology Clearinghouse, University of South Florida. Drawings.
 JASNA Northern California Region. Jane Austen Society of North America. Illustrations and text.
 The Kinross Carriageworks, Stirling (Scotland), 1802–1966.
 Lexique du cheval! Lexikon of Carriage driving.
 Modern carriages, by W. Gilbey, 1905. The University of Hong Kong Libraries, China–America Digital Academic Library (CADAL).
 Passenger Vehicles The Guild of Model Wheelwrights. Illustrations and text.
 Science and Society Picture Library – Search Illustrations and text.
 Treatise on Carriages. Comprehending Coaches, Chariots, Phaetons, Curricles, Whiskeys, &c. Together with Their Proper Harness. In Which the Fair Prices of Every Article are Accurately Stated, by William Felton, coachmaker, 1794. Google Book Search.
 TTM web Texas Transportation Museum, San Antonio. Photos and text.
 Wheeled vehicles. The New York Times, 29 October 1871, page 2.

 
Animal-powered vehicles
Horse driving
Obsolete technologies